Shankar Vihar is a residential complex for serving personnel of the Indian Armed Forces and their families, provided by the Government of India. Currently there are more than 278 houses including Permanent & Temporary.  It is surrounded by an airbase, open fields and scrub forests. It is located in Delhi Cantonment.

Shankar Vihar houses a huge shopping complex and an Army Public School, among other things.

The area is well maintained and has scenic viewpoints as well as manicured parks, gymnasiums, swimming pools and restaurants.

Neighbourhoods in Delhi